= Surf Trash =

Australian indie round group

- Genres: Indie rock
- Years active: 2017–present
- Labels: Surf Trash; BLVE
- Members: Andrew Scott; Lachlan Jackson; Patrick Russell; Nick Scott
- Website: www.surftrashband.com

Surf Trash is an Australian indie rock group composed of Andrew Scott (drums/lead vocals), Lachlan Jackson (guitar), Patrick Russell (guitar) and Nick Scott (bass).

The group released their debut EP Busy Doing Nothing in March 2019 and debut album The Only Place I Know on 13 September 2024.

In 2025, "Wrong or Right", a non-album single released in 2020, was certified Gold by Australian Recording Industry Association (ARIA).

== Discography ==
=== Studio albums ===
List of studio albums, with release date, label, and selected chart positions shown
Title	Album details	Peak chart positions
Title	Album details	AUS
The Only Place I Know	Released: 13 September 2024; Label: BLVE	17

=== Extended plays ===
List of EPs, with selected details
Title	Details
Busy Doing Nothing	Released: March 2019; Label: Surf Trash
Under the Radar	Released: January 2023; Label: Surf Trash

=== Certified songs ===
Title	Year	Certifications	Album
"Wrong or Right"	2020	ARIA: Gold	Non-album single
